= Fibrillation (video game) =

2012 video game

- Developer: Egor Rezenov
- Platform: Windows
- Release: 2012
- Genres: First person, horror
- Mode: Single-player

Fibrillation is a 2012 first-person perspective video game created by Egor Rezenov. The story follows a man named Ewan as he travels between life and death after a car accident renders him unconscious.

== Gameplay and plot ==
In Fibrillation, the player controls Ewan Berrington from a first-person perspective. The game begins with Ewan finding himself in a dream-like realm. As the player progresses, they experience images and sounds from the real world - such as ambulance sirens, hospital lights, and a woman crying. At some points, Ewan is also pursued by a massive, snake-like shadow.

At some point, Ewan hears a heart monitor before it flatlines, and realizes that his heart has stopped. Continuing forward, he finds himself between two "points of interest". The first is Ewan lying in an emergency response room; while the second is a stone gate that tries to pull Ewan in. The player has two choices: fight the gate and return to Ewan's body, thus surviving; or pass through the gate before it closes, choosing death.
